is a passenger railway station located in the Takebe-chō neighborhood of Kita-ku of the city of Okayama, Okayama Prefecture, Japan. It is operated by West Japan Railway Company (JR West).

Lines

Station layout
The station consists of one ground-level side platform serving  single bi-directional track. There is a simple station building which serves as a waiting room.The station is unattended.

Adjacent stations

History
Bizen-Hara Station opened as a temporary station on April 1, 1927 and was closed on October 1 of the same year. it reopened on February 20, 1928 and was upgraded to a full passenger station on June 20, 1929.  With the privatization of the Japan National Railways (JNR) on April 1, 1987, the station came under the aegis of the West Japan Railway Company.

Passenger statistics
In fiscal 2019, the station was used by an average of 98 passengers daily..

Surrounding area
Animo Museum (Yuko Arimori Museum)
Okayama Municipal Makiishi Elementary School

See also
List of railway stations in Japan

References

External links

 Bizen-Hara Station Official Site

Railway stations in Okayama
Tsuyama Line
Railway stations in Japan opened in 1927